The 1922 Dartmouth Indians football team was an American football team that represented Dartmouth College as an independent during the 1922 college football season. In their second season under head coach Jackson Cannell, the Indians compiled a 6–3 record and outscored all opponents by a total of 111 to 55. Charles Burke was the team captain.

Schedule

References

Dartmouth
Dartmouth Big Green football seasons
Dartmouth Indians football